Pljuni i zapjevaj moja Jugoslavijo (trans. Spit and Start Singing, My Yugoslavia) is the eighth studio album by Yugoslav rock band Bijelo Dugme, released in 1986.

Pljuni i zapjevaj moja Jugoslavijo is the band's first album recorded with vocalist Alen Islamović, who came to the band as replacement for Mladen Vojičić "Tifa". It is also the band's first album since 1977 live album Koncert kod Hajdučke česme to feature keyboardist Laza Ristovski as the official member of the band and the band's last studio album to feature keyboardist Vlado Pravdić.

The album was polled in 1998 as the 53rd on the list of 100 greatest Yugoslav rock and pop albums in the book YU 100: najbolji albumi jugoslovenske rok i pop muzike (YU 100: The Best Albums of Yugoslav Pop and Rock Music).

Background and recording

New singer: Alen Islamović
Divlje Jagode vocalist Alen Islamović, who took over as Bijelo Dugme's singer in early fall 1986, had been unsuccessfully pursued two years earlier by the band's leader Goran Bregović in the immediate aftermath of long-time vocalist Željko Bebek's spring 1984 departure from the band. Unsure about volatile interpersonal relations within the band and fearing Bebek's possible return into the fold, Islamović had decided to turn the offer down at the time and stay with Divlje Jagode; twenty-three-year-old upstart Mladen "Tifa" Vojičić thus became Bijelo Dugme's new vocalist, recording a studio album, 1984's Bijelo Dugme, with the band.

Under the pressure of professional obligations, sudden fame, and media scandal that revealed his LSD usage, Vojičić left Bijelo Dugme after only a year, and Divlje Jagode's Islamović got approached once again about joining. This time, Divlje Jagode were based out of London, pursuing an international career under the modified name Wild Strawberries. Doubting Divlje Jagode's international prospects, 29-year-old Islamović decided to take the offer this time, leaving Wild Strawberries and returning to Yugoslavia to join Bijelo Dugme. Talking about the second vocalist change in two years and the band's personnel issues in general, Bregović stated at the time:

(Self)-censorship
Due to pressure from Yugoslav communist authorities, Bregović would eventually give up on implementing some of the ideas he had originally envisioned for the album.

When he began conceptualizing it, Bregović wanted Pljuni i zapjevaj moja Jugoslavijo to contain contributions from individuals known for holding political views outside of SFR Yugoslavia's official ideology as espoused by the Yugoslav Communist League (SKJ), the only legally allowed political party in the country. To that end, he and the band's manager Raka Marić approached three such individuals who had at that point been effectively proscribed from public discourse in Yugoslavia for over a decade: 
pop singer Vice Vukov who had represented SFR Yugoslavia at the 1963 Eurovision Song Contest before seeing his career prospects marginalized due to being branded a Croatian nationalist as a result of his association with the Croatian Spring political movement,
painter and experimental filmmaker Mića Popović, associated with Yugoslav Black Wave film movement, who got a dissident reputation due to his paintings and early 1960s films,
and politician and diplomat Koča Popović who despite a prominent World War II role with the Partisan resistance guerrillas as their 1st Proletarian Brigade commander—an engagement that in the post-war communist Yugoslavia earned him the Order of the People's Hero medal followed by high political and diplomatic appointments—nevertheless got silently removed from public life in 1972 after coming out in support of Latinka Perović and Marko Nikezić, leading figures of the so-called "", a liberal faction within the Yugoslav Communist League's SR Serbia branch.

Bregović's idea was to have Vukov sing the "Ružica si bila, sada više nisi" ("You Were Once a Rose") ballad. However, despite Vukov accepting, the plan never got implemented after the band's manager Marić got detained and interrogated by the police at the Sarajevo Airport upon returning from Zagreb where he had met with Vukov. Mića Popović's contribution to the album was to be his Dve godine garancije (A Two-Year Warranty) painting featuring a pensioner sleeping on a park bench while using pages of Politika newspaper as blanket to warm himself, which Bregović wanted to use as the album cover. When approached, Mića Popović also accepted though warning Bregović of possible problems the musician would likely face. Finally, Koča Popović was reportedly somewhat receptive to the idea of participating on the album, but still turned the offer down.

Eventually, under pressure from the band's record label, Diskoton, Bregović gave up on his original idea and turned to alternative solutions. He decided to secure at least one aging pre-World War II Yugoslav revolutionary's appearance on the album. Reaching out to surviving individuals of that ilk was done through Duga journalist and writer Milomir Marić who had been known to keep contact with many of them as part of the preparatory work for his upcoming book Deca komunizma (Children of Communism). Bregović was able to get seventy-three-year-old Svetozar Vukmanović Tempo to agree, visiting him in his  home and arranging for Tempo to travel to Sarajevo where—backed by the Ljubica Ivezić orphanage choir—he recorded the old revolutionary song "Padaj silo i nepravdo" ("Fall, (Oh) Force and Injustice").

Keyboardist Laza Ristovski, who had left Bijelo Dugme in 1978, came back as guest for the previous studio album's recording sessions before fully rejoining as an official member after its December 1984 release. Pljuni i zapjevaj moja Jugoslavijo thus became the first Bijelo Dugme release since 1977 live album Koncert kod Hajdučke česme to feature Ristovski as an official member.

Pljuni i zapjevaj moja Jugoslavijo features similar Balkan folk-infused pop rock sound as Bijelo Dugme, and was similarly inspired by Yugoslavism, containing numerous references to Yugoslav unity as well as the lyrics on the inner sleeve printed in both Cyrillic and Latin alphabets.

The album cover featured a photograph of Chinese social realist ballet.

Track listing
All songs written by Goran Bregović, except where noted. The title track actually uses the melody from Survivor's hit "Eye of the Tiger" (1982), while the melody of "Zamisli" is based on "Jungle Man" (1985) by Red Hot Chili Peppers.

Personnel
 Goran Bregović - guitar
 Alen Islamović - vocals
 Zoran Redžić - bass guitar
 Ipe Ivandić - drums
 Vlado Pravdić - keyboards
 Laza Ristovski - keyboards

Additional personnel
Svetozar Vukmanović Tempo - vocals (on track 1)
Amila Sulejmanović - backing vocals
Amela - backing vocals
Zumreta Midžić "Zuzi Zu" - backing vocals
Nenad Stefanović Japanac - bass guitar
Sinan Alimanović - keyboards
Slobodan Sokolović - trombone
Branko Podbrežnički - recorded by, mixed by
Damir Begović - recorded by, mixed by
Vlado Perić - design

Reception

The album's biggest hits turned out to be "Hajdemo u planine", "Noćas je k'o lubenica pun mjesec iznad Bosne", "A i ti me iznevjeri" and ballads "Te noći kad umrem, kad odem, kad me ne bude" and "Ružica si bila, sada više nisi". The subsequent Yugoslavia-wide promotional tour was also very successful with sold-out sports arenas everywhere the band went.

Bregović vs. Dragan Kremer
Large section of the critics, however, disliked Pljuni i zapjevaj moja Jugoslavijo. In his Danas review, Dragan Kremer drew parallels between the developing economic and political crisis in SFR Yugoslavia and what he sees to be the band's ongoing creative crisis:

{{cquote|Unfortunately, what makes this album so 'Yugoslav' mostly has to do with the crisis and lack of criteria, which are no longer possible to hide.}}

In 1987, Kremer went further while appearing as guest on TV Sarajevo's show Mit mjeseca (Myth of the Month), a programme pitting Yugoslav rock critics against the country's rock stars—allowing critics to directly pose questions to musicians sitting across from them in the same studio. In the case of Kremer's appearance, Bregović wasn't in the studio due to being on tour—Kremer's taped questions were thus shown to Bregović while his reaction was filmed. Expressing his dislike of the band's new album, Kremer looked into the camera and addressed Bregović directly:

Upon stating the above, Kremer tore up the Pljuni i zapjevaj moja Jugoslavijo album cover. A visibly angry Bregović reacted by cursing under his breath and launching into an insult-laden tirade directed at Kramer: "It's hard, even for a fool, to harbour ambitions of being liked by everyone, especially by these kinds of fat little pigs with sideburns who probably still masturbate on a regular basis in their forties. Even asking me to answer this pile of imbecilic questions, I mean.... But there's something that doesn't make sense here: we're about to go on a tour with 400,000 copies of this album already sold, which guys like this crap on regularly. So, either the people are fools, which would make what this guy's saying right or I'm still better at writing songs than he is at writing reviews". The incident got a lot of play in the Yugoslav media at the time with the angle of usually calm and collected Bregović losing his temper being the focus.

Vukmanović's appearance on the album was described by The Guardian as "some sort of Bregović's coup d'état".

Legacy
In 1998, the Pljuni i zapjevaj moja Jugoslavijo album was ranked 53rd on the list of 100 greatest Yugoslav rock and pop albums in the book YU 100: najbolji albumi jugoslovenske rok i pop muzike (YU 100: The Best Albums of Yugoslav Pop and Rock Music).

In 2015 Pljuni i zapjevaj moja Jugoslavijo album cover was ranked the 3rd on the list of 100 Greatest Album Covers of Yugoslav Rock published by web magazine Balkanrock.

"New Partisans"
Alongside Plavi Orkestar's Smrt fašizmu! and Merlin's Teško meni sa tobom (a još teže bez tebe), Pljuni i zapjevaj, moja Jugoslavijo has occasionally been categorized as part of New Partisans, a mid-1980s collection of albums by Sarajevo-based bands, featuring sound centered on the Balkan folk-inspired rock music as well as containing lyrical and visual references to Yugoslavism within communist and socialist patriotic framework.

The term New Partisans got introduced during fall 1986 by Plavi Orkestar's manager  during Smrt fašizmu!'s promotional cycle as means of promoting his clients' latest release and potentially jump starting another (sub)cultural movement, similar to what he had participated in achieving three years earlier with the New Primitives. Unlike the New Primitive bands that all came from similar background and were of the same generation, the supposed New Partisan bands were much more disparate. Though the New Partisans never took off as a coherent movement, the term got picked up by numerous Yugoslav journalists who continue to use it when describing various phases in Bijelo Dugme's, Dino Merlin's, Plavi Orkestar's and Hari Mata Hari's respective careers.

Covers
Serbian folk singer Ana Bekuta recorded a cover of "A i ti me iznevjeri" on her 1993 album Pitaš me kako živim.
In 1993 Bregović wrote the soundtrack for Emir Kusturica's surrealist drama Arizona Dream, including a new version of "Hajdemo u planine" titled "Get The Money" with English language lyrics and sung by Iggy Pop.
Serbian ensemble Fejat Sejdić Trumpet Orchestra recorded a cover of "Hajdemo u planine" on their 1994 album Na Dragačevskom saboru orkestara u Guči.
Turkish pop singer Sezen Aksu recorded covers of "Te noći kad umrem, kad odem, kad me ne bude", "A i ti me iznevjeri", and "Ružica si bila, sada više nisi" with Turkish lyrics—titled "Allah'ın Varsa", "Kasım Yağmurları", and "Gül", respectively—on her 1997 Bregović-produced album Düğün ve Cenaze.
Croatian pop singer Alka Vuica recorded a cover of "Ružica si bila, sada više nisi", entitled "Ružica", on her 2001 album Profesionalka.
Serbian folk singer Usnija Redžepova recorded a cover of "A i ti me iznevjeri" on her 2007 album Oko Niša kiša.
Bosnian and Yugoslav rock band Teška Industrija recorded a cover of "A i ti me iznvjeri" on their 2010 album Bili smo raja.
Bosnian and Yugoslav pop singer Zuzi Zu, who sung backing vocals on Pljuni i zapjevaj moja Jugoslavijo'', recorded a cover of "Ružica si bila", releasing it as a single in 2011.

References

External links
Pljuni i zapjevaj moja Jugoslavijo at Discogs

1986 albums
Bijelo Dugme albums
Diskoton albums